The Southern California Legends, known commonly as the SoCal Legends, were a team in the Continental Basketball Association. 

The Legends are owned and coached by former NBA player Gary Grant. They played their home games at Azusa Pacific University's Felix Events Center. They were formerly a part of the American Basketball Association, and in their first and only season there, they went 20-5 in their first season, made it into the playoffs, moved on to the Great Eight Tournament and made it to the championship game, where they were defeated by the Rochester Razorsharks, 117-114.

The team had planned to go to the CBA in 2006, but then realized that their new arena, Gilbert Sports and Fitness Center on the campus of California Lutheran University in Thousand Oaks, California was not going to be completed in time, so they decided in the end to begin play in 2007.  In the end, the Legends could not seal the arena deal and folded entirely sometime in the fall of 2007.  Before then, mention of the team had already been removed from the website of its owner, Trinity Sports and Entertainment Group.

References

Basketball teams in California
Defunct American Basketball Association (2000–present) teams
2005 establishments in California
2007 disestablishments in California
Basketball teams established in 2005
Basketball teams disestablished in 2007
Basketball teams in Los Angeles
Sports in Los Angeles County, California